Xiang Gao is a Chinese violinist. He is cited by The New York Times as "a rare and soulful virtuoso". He has also been a featured soloist performing for world leaders including two U.S. Presidents, three Chinese Presidents, and Juan Carlos I. 

He is also the director and violinist of the University of Delaware's Ensemble-in-Residence, 6-WIRE. The other members of the 6-WIRE world music trio are award-winning Chinese erhu player, Yue (Cathy) Yang, and American pianist, Matthew Brower. The trio made their Carnegie Hall, NY, debut on February 16, 2019.

See also
Master Players Concert Series

References

Chinese violinists
Living people
University of Delaware faculty
Year of birth missing (living people)
21st-century violinists
University of Michigan alumni